Hjorted is a locality situated in Västervik Municipality, Kalmar County, Sweden with 324 inhabitants in 2010.

Notable people
 

Erik Reimhult (1915-1999), sculptor

References 

Populated places in Kalmar County
Populated places in Västervik Municipality